George W. Althouse (August 6, 1895 – November 21, 1981) was a Nebraska state senator representing North Omaha in the Nebraska Legislature. He was born in Roanoke, Missouri.

Althouse, a Republican, was appointed to fill the vacancy in the Nebraska Senate in 1970 following the death of African American Senator Edward Danner. He sought re-election in 1970 but was defeated by Sen. Ernie Chambers.

In addition to being a senator, Althouse was active in the Nebraska GOP. In 1964, as a member of the Republican State Central Committee, he was sent as a delegate to the national GOP convention. In 1966, he served on the executive committee of the Douglas County Republican Party. From 1963 to 1966, he served on the Omaha Human Relations Board. He was appointed to the housing committee of the White House Conference on Aging. He was also a member of the US Civil Rights Commission for Nebraska and the Nebraska Equal Opportunity Commission.

In 1981, Althouse and his wife, Mildred, were presented awards for their political activities and work in Omaha's African American communities by the Nebraska Black Republican Council.

References

African-American state legislators in Nebraska
Republican Party Nebraska state senators
1895 births
1981 deaths
20th-century African-American people
Republican
Senators